The 1911 Campeonato Paulista, organized by the LPF (Liga Paulista de Football), was the 10th season of São Paulo's top association football league. São Paulo Athletic won the title for the 4th time. no teams were relegated and the top scorer was Americano's Décio Viccari with 9 goals.

System
The championship was disputed in a double-round robin system, with the team with the most points winning the title.

Championship

References

Campeonato Paulista seasons
Paulista